Calmar is a town in central Alberta, Canada. It was named in 1900 for Kalmar, Sweden, the home town of its first postmaster, C. J. Blomquist.

Geography

Climate
Calmar experiences a humid continental climate (Köppen Dfb).

Demographics 

In the 2016 Census of Population conducted by Statistics Canada, the Town of Calmar recorded a population of 2,228 living in 842 of its 861 total private dwellings, a  change from its 2011 population of 1,970.

The population of the Town of Calmar according to its 2014 municipal census is 2,101, a  change from its 2009 municipal census population of 2,033.

Economy 
The Town of Calmar is a member of the Leduc-Nisku Economic Development Association, an economic development partnership that markets Alberta's International Region in proximity to the Edmonton International Airport.

See also 
List of communities in Alberta
List of towns in Alberta

References

External links 

1949 establishments in Alberta
Edmonton Metropolitan Region
Leduc County
Towns in Alberta